St. Thomas' College of Engineering and Technology is an engineering college located at Kidderpore, in Kolkata, India. Initially under Kalyani University, it is now affiliated with Maulana Abul Kalam Azad University of Technology (MAKAUT; formerly West Bengal University of Technology, WBUT), Kolkata.

The campus also houses the St Thomas School, Kolkata and St. Stephen's Church.

Courses offered
The institute offers one undergraduate course (B. Tech.). All courses are approved by MAKAUT, the All India Council for Technical Education (AICTE), Government of India and the Department of Higher Education, Government of West Bengal. The institute offers undergraduate B. Tech. course in the following engineering disciplines:

 Electrical Engineering
 Electronics and Communication Engineering
 Information Technology
 Computer Science and Engineering

All these four programmes are NBA accredited. Provision for sports activities and games like cricket, football and basketball are available within the campus. Students interested in taking part should procure recommended shorts and vest. Further information will be provided from the college office. Besides these the college also offers Boys' Common Room and Girls' Common Room facility .

See also

References

External link
 

Engineering colleges in West Bengal
Colleges affiliated to West Bengal University of Technology
Universities and colleges in South 24 Parganas district
Educational institutions established in 2000
2000 establishments in West Bengal